{{DISPLAYTITLE:C24H36O2}}
The molecular formula C24H36O2 (molar mass: 356.54 g/mol, exact mass: 356.2715 u) may refer to:

 JWH-359
 Nisinic acid

Molecular formulas